Susanna Laurila  is a Finnish mountain bike orienteering competitor and World Champion. She won an individual gold medal at the 2012 World MTB Orienteering Championships, and a silver medal in 2013.

References

Finnish orienteers
Female orienteers
Finnish female cyclists
Mountain bike orienteers
Year of birth missing (living people)
Living people
Place of birth missing (living people)
Finnish mountain bikers